is a city in northeastern Osaka Prefecture, Japan. , the city had an estimated population of 397,681 in 183075 households and a population density of 6100 persons per km2.

Geography
Hirakata is located in northeastern of Osaka Prefecture, almost halfway between the metropolis of Osaka and Kyoto. It is bordered by the Ikoma Mountains to the east.

Neighboring municipalities
Osaka Prefecture
Neyagawa
Katano
Takatsuki
Shimamoto
Kyoto Prefecture
Yawata
Kyōtanabe
Nara Prefecture
Ikoma

Climate
Hirakata has a Humid subtropical climate (Köppen Cfa) characterized by warm summers and cool winters with light to no snowfall.

Demographics
Per Japanese census data, the population of Hirakata rose rapidly in the 1960s and 1970s, and less rapidly since.

Eriko Aoki, author of "Korean children, textbooks, and educational practices in Japanese primary schools," stated that the city's location in proximity to both Osaka City and Kyoto contributed to its population growth of ten times its previous size from around 1973 to 2013.

Ethnic Koreans
As of 2013 the city has about 2,000 ethnic Koreans. Most Hirakata Koreans, including children of school age, use Japanese names.  Many Koreans in Hirakata operate their own businesses. Hirakata has the "mother's society" or "Omoni no Kai", a voluntary association of ethnic Korean mothers. It also has branches of the Chongryon and Mindan, Japan's two major Korean associations. Hirakata has no particular Korean neighborhoods. There were about 3,000 ethnic Koreans in Hirakata in the pre-World War II period. In the 1930s Hirakata Koreans, fearful of keeping their own jobs, had negative attitudes towards Osaka-based Koreans who were looking for employment after having lost their jobs. Military construction was the most common job sector of that era's Korean population. Eriko Aoki stated that in 2013 there was still a sense of difference between the Koreans in Hirakata and the Koreans in Osaka.

History
The area of the modern city of Hirakata was within ancient Kawachi Province. The place name of "Hirakata" is very old, appearing in the Kojiki, Nihon Shoki and other ancient texts. During the Asuka period, the early Buddhist temple of Kudara-dera indicates the settlement of many immigrants from Baekje in the Korean Peninsula from an early time. During the Heian period, the hills from Katano to part of Hirakata were called "Katano ga Hara" and were a hunting ground for the imperial family and were famous for cherry blossoms. The Osaka Kaidō, an extension of the Tōkaidō highway passed through the area, and in the Edo Period Hirakata-juku developed as a post station on the highway and a river port on the Yodo River.

The Hirakata Town was established with the creation of the modern municipalities system on April 1, 1889.  Hirakata was elevated to city status on August 1, 1947. On April 1, 2001, Hirakata was designated as a special city of Japan. On April 1, 2014, Hirakata became a Core city with increased local autonomy.

Government
Hirakata has a mayor-council form of government with a directly elected mayor and a unicameral city council of 32 members. Hirakata, together with neighboring Katano, contributes four members to the Osaka Prefectural Assembly. In terms of national politics, the city is part of Osaka 11th district of the lower house of the Diet of Japan.

Mayors
 Sōichirō Terashima (in office 1947 – 1955, 1959 – 1967) former mayor of Hirakata-chō
 Harufumi Hatakeyama (1955–1959)
 Tomizō Yamamura (1967–1975)
 Kazuo Kitamaki (1975–1991)
 Kazuo Ōshio (1991–1995)
 Hiroshi Nakatsuka (1995–2007)
 Osamu Takeuchi (2007–2015)
 Takashi Fushimi (2015–present)

Economy
Hirakata's modern industry began with the munitions industry supplying to the Imperial Japanese Army and numerous civilian textile and clothing manufacturers. In the post-war era, the former munitions plants were transformed into industrial parks, or public housing complexes to support Hirakata's growth as a commuter town for Osaka and Kyoto. Textile and clothing production remain major industries in Hirakata.

Companies with offices in Hirakata
Komatsu Osaka plant
Sanyo Electric Co R&D

Education

Colleges and universities
Kansai Gaidai University
Osaka Dental University
Kansai Medical University
Setsunan University
Osaka International University
Osaka Institute of Technology
National Tax College

Primary and secondary education
Hirakata has 45 public elementary schools and 19 public middle schools operated by the city government and six public high schools operated by the Osaka Prefectural Department of Education, and one by Osaka City. There is also one private elementary school, two private middle schools and three private high schools. The prefecture also operates two special education schools for the handicapped.

Prefectural senior high schools

Municipal high schools
 – In Hirakata

Private senior high schools:

Transportation

Railway
 JR West – Katamachi Line (Gakkentoshi Line) 
  -  - 
 Keihan Electric Railway - Keihan Main Line
  -  -  -  -  - 
 Keihan Electric Railway - Katano Line
  -  -  -

Highway
  Second Keihan Highway
 Daini Keihan Road (toll road)

Sister city and friendship city relations
  Shimanto, Kōchi, Japan – Friendship city agreement concluded in 1974 (with former Nakamura city)
  Betsukai, Hokkaidō, Japan – Friendship city agreement concluded in 1987
  Takamatsu, Kagawa, Japan – Friendship city agreement concluded in 1987 (with former Shionoe town)
  Changning District, Shanghai, China – Sister city agreement concluded in 1987
  Logan City, Queensland, Australia – Sister city agreement concluded in 1995

Local attractions

 Hirakata Park, an amusement park that includes roller coasters made of wood.
Kudara-dera ruins
Kinyakurumazuka Kofun
Kuzuha Battery Site

Notable people from Hirakata
 Hikaru Nakamura, Japanese American chess player
 Janne Da Arc, Japanese visual kei rock band
 Iori Kogawa, Japanese AV Idol
 Koichiro Yoshinaga, Japanese former Nippon Professional Baseball catcher/infielder
 Airi Shimizu, Japanese gravure idol, actress and variety tarento
 Yuji Naka, Japanese video game programmer, designer, and producer who made Sonic the Hedgehog 
 Satoshi Hashimoto, Japanese actor and voice actor 
 Nobukazu Takemura, Japanese musician and artist
 Haruto Shirai, Japanese football player
 Kenji Honnami, former Japanese football player
 Yuki Kuniyoshi, professional Japanese baseball player
 Junichi Okada, singer, actor and member of popular Japanese boy band V6
 Katsuhisa Inamori, former Japanese football player
 Midori, Japanese American violinist and classical musician
 Kenji Moriwaki, Japanese comedian and radio personality
 Masahito Noto, Japanese football player
 Hirofumi Mukai, Japanese professional boxer
 Yohei Takeda, Japanese football player and goalkeeper
 Hisaya Morishige, Japanese actor and comedian
 Yuji Hino, Japanese professional wrestler
 Yuka Ishii, Japanese writer
 Takayuki Fukumura, Japanese football player
 Yoshimitsu Takashima, Japanese politician of the Democratic Party of Japan, a member of the House of Councillors in the Diet (national legislature)

References

External links

Hirakata City official website 
www.city.hirakata.osaka.jp.e.cu.hp.transer.com 

 
Cities in Osaka Prefecture